Radisson School, originally Radisson Elementary School, is a school that is part of River East Transcona School Division in Winnipeg, Manitoba. It was built in 1957 and was originally an eight-room building. Radisson was named for famed fur trader Pierre-Esprit Radisson, the unanimous choice of the students. Margaret Underhill was the first principal of the school and first female principal in the division.

External links
River East Transcona School Division
Radisson School

Elementary schools in Winnipeg
Educational institutions established in 1957
1957 establishments in Manitoba